Sekolah Menengah Sains Kuala Selangor (abbreviated KUSESS) is a Fully Residential School, also known as Sekolah Berasrama Penuh (SBP) in Malaysia. The school was built under the Sixth Malaysia Plan. The school is located in Bandar Melawati, Kuala Selangor which is about 70 kilometres from the nation's capital, Kuala Lumpur. Construction works on the school began on 24 April 1994 and were completed in 1996.

The school started operating on 8 September 1996, with a first intake of 210 students, 19 teaching staff and 4 support staff. The following year saw a sharp increase in the number of students that were admitted to the school. 187 students gained entry to Form 1 while 165 students were admitted into Form 4. The teaching staff almost tripled from 19 to 53. On 27 May 1997 the school was officiated by the then Deputy Prime Minister-Dato' Seri Anwar Ibrahim.

By 1998, the number of students had grown to 810 and the teaching staff had a strength of 63 people. The year also saw the retirement of the school's first principal Tuan Haji Khamis bin Maarof. He was replaced by Tuan Haji Ariffin bin Abdul Rahaman, who left his post at Sekolah Menengah Kadok, Kota Bahru, Kelantan to take the seat as the principal. It was also the year which saw the students of the school sit for Penilaian Menengah Rendah (PMR) and Sijil Pelajaran Malaysia (SPM) examinations for the first time. The results were an overwhelming success as for PMR the school was ranked as one of the top 5 Sekolah Berasrama Penuhs (SBP), while in SPM 147 students out of 148 students obtained first rank.

Today the school has 783 students in 25 classes, taught by 75 teachers.

School logo and flag

Logo
 The Book represents knowledge,
 The Three Circles represent academic and co-curricular activities,
 Berilmu Beramal Berbakti is the school's motto, which translates to being knowledgeable, doing good deeds and having a level of devotion in all courses undertaken by the school.
 Gear and Conical Flask represent achievement in science and technology.
Flag
 Yellow represents achievement
 Red represents bravery, persistence, and  spirit.
 The merging triangles of red and yellow represent unity.

Tradition
The school hosts the "Hari Penganugerahan Kecemerlangan ", an annual weekend event celebrating the Sijil Pelajaran Malaysia result achievers. It is modelled after the convocation ceremony of universities. The graduation robe is maroon.

The school has four dress codes based on the day of the week. On Mondays, students wear a blazer, on Wednesdays they wear the uniform of their uniform units. On Thursdays it is the traditional batik and on Fridays it is Baju Melayu complete with samping for the boys while Baju Kurung is worn by the girls.

The school stages an assembly every weekday morning in which prayers are recited and the National anthem (Negaraku), the Selangor State song and the school songs are sung. The national pledge (Rukun Negara) is also recited during the assembly. During the days of Puan Rosida; the school's third principle, 'spot talk' was held during the assembly. A student is chosen at random and given a topic to talk about in English.

Co-curriculum
Clubs and societies

 Language & Cultural Society
 English Language & Drama Society
 Living Skills Club
 Guidance & Counseling Club
 Student Peer Counseling Club
 Kompang Club
 Mathematics & Science Club
 Islamic Student Society
 History & Geography Club
 Arts Club

Uniform units
 KRS
 Scouts
 Malaysian Red Crescent Society
 Fire Brigade Cadet
 Puteri Islam
 Girl Guides
 Police Cadet
 Taekwondo 
 Silat Gayung Fatani

Games
 Chess & Archery Club
 Netball Club
 Basketball & Handball Club
 Takraw & Volleyball Club
 Ping Pong & Badminton Club
 Soccer & Rugby Club
 Hockey & Tennis Club
 E-sports & Extreme sports Club

Principals

Association of Parents and Teachers (PIBG)

Head Students 
The Head Students is selected amongst the ranks of the Student Representative Council (MPP) to assist in commanding, running and managing school affairs. He is assisted by a committee (Majlis Tertinggi) and primarily follow the guidance and orders of the current Senior Student Affairs Teacher (PK HEM).

Full Colours Award recipient
The Full Colours  award is awarded by the SBP Sekolah Berasrama Penuh body to students for their academic and co-curricular achievements as well as their contributions not only to their own school but to the SBPs as whole. The students from Sekolah Menengah Sains Kuala Selangor have received the award in the following years.

List of Gold Achievement students 
Definition of Gold Achievement Student

List of Full Colours students 
Definition of Full Colours students

Pencapaian Kokurikulum 2008/2009

See also 
 List of schools in Selangor

External links
 http://www.kusess.edu.my 

Educational institutions established in 1996
1996 establishments in Malaysia
Co-educational boarding schools
Schools in Selangor